The Piano Man's Daughter is a 2003 television film, adapted from the 1995 novel of the same name by Timothy Findley. Rights to the novel's film adaptation were originally purchased by Whoopi Goldberg. Goldberg acquired the film rights after reading the novel while in Toronto starring in Norman Jewison’s film “Bogus”. Deciding that as a Canadian novel it would be most appropriate to work with a Canadian film studio, Goldberg produced the film in collaboration with Canadian producer Kevin Sullivan's Sullivan Entertainment.

Plot
A young man must deal with several generations of madness and familial intrigue. Charlie Kilworth is a young man whose mother, Lily, is the daughter of Frederick Wyatt, the owner of a well-known piano manufacturing company. Lily is also a free-spirited and unstable woman, who bore Charlie out of wedlock, has had a number of lovers over the years, and has an unsettling fascination with fire. Lily's mother Ede has put her daughter in a mental hospital on several occasions, and is considering having Lily lobotomized. Charlie, meanwhile, has had affairs with a number of women but has never settled down with anyone; working as an events coordinator at a resort hotel, Charlie becomes infatuated with Alex Lamont, the singer in a dance band Charlie has booked into the ballroom. Lily urges her son to get married and raise a family, but Charlie isn't so sure he's ready for a lifetime commitment, and Alex becomes frustrated by Charlie's inability to take their relationship seriously. Meanwhile, Ede and Frederick have decided that Lily needs to be permanently committed to an institution; Charlie insists that they send her to a comfortable private facility, but then discovers that a mysterious benefactor has been supporting Lily for years, and Ede and Frederick have decided if Lily is to be in a private institution, then the generous stranger must be the one who pays for it.

Cast

Wendy Crewson as Ede Kilworth
Christian Campbell as Charlie Kilworth
 Jeffrey Peel and McKenzie Sullivan as Charlie (8 yrs.)
Marnie McPhail as Young Lily Kilworth
R.H. Thomson as Frederick Wyatt
Sarah Strange as Alexandra Lamont
Susan Coyne as Ada Harrison
Chris Wiggins as James Kilworth
Joel S. Keller as Neddy Harrison
Deborah Pollitt as Eleanor Ormond
David Hemblen as Dr. Warren
Nuala Fitzgerald as Eliza Kilworth
Dixie Seatle as Eleanor Hess
Stockard Channing as Lily Kilworth
Robert Fusco as the baby

References

External links

Sullivanmovies.com - Official Piano Man's Daughter Page

English-language Canadian films
Canadian drama television films
2003 drama films
Films based on Canadian novels
2003 television films
2003 films
Films directed by Kevin Sullivan
2000s English-language films
2000s Canadian films